Bradley Raymond is an American film director, animator and storyboard artist best known for his work on animated shows and films as well as working at Disney. He has directed numerous sequels including Pocahontas II: Journey to a New World (1998), The Hunchback of Notre Dame II (2002), and The Lion King 1½ (2004). Raymond also directed Tinker Bell (2008), Tinker Bell and the Great Fairy Rescue (2010), and the television special Pixie Hollow Games (2011).

Filmography

Storyboard
 Bonkers (1993)
 All-New Dennis the Menace (1993)
 Aladdin (1994)
 Thumbelina (1994)
 A Troll in Central Park (1994)
 Quack Pack (1996)
 Cats Don't Dance (1997)

Animator
 Cats Don't Dance (1997)

Assistant Animator
 A Troll in Central Park (1994)

Writer
 Tinker Bell (2008)
 Tinker Bell and the Great Fairy Rescue (2010)

Director
 Pocahontas II: Journey to a New World (1998)
 Mickey's Once Upon a Christmas (1999) (segment "Donald Duck: Stuck on Christmas")
 The Hunchback of Notre Dame II (2002)
 The Lion King 1½ (2004)
 Tinker Bell (2008)
 Tinker Bell and the Great Fairy Rescue (2010)
 Pixie Hollow Games (2011) (TV special)

Dialogue Director
 The Lion King 1½ (2004)

Story Consultant
 Pooh's Heffalump Movie (2005)

Senior Creative Team
 The Lion King 1½ (2004)
 Tinker Bell (2008)
 Secret of the Wings (2012)
 Planes (2013)
 The Pirate Fairy (2014)
 Planes: Fire & Rescue (2014)

External links

American animators
American film directors
American male screenwriters
American storyboard artists
American animated film directors
American voice directors
Walt Disney Animation Studios people
Living people
Year of birth missing (living people)